Ailbhe Darcy (born 1981) is an Irish poet and Wales Book of the Year award laureate.

Career
Ailbhe Darcy was born in 1981 and grew up in Dublin. In 2015, she was awarded an MFA and a PhD from the University of Notre Dame. Darcy now lives in Cardiff. She won the Wales Book of the Year award and the Pigott Poetry Prize at the 2019 Listowel Writers' Week with her collection Insistence, which was also shortlisted for the T. S. Eliot Prize and the Irish Times Poetry Now Award.

Darcy is a Senior Lecturer in Creative Writing at Cardiff University.

Bibliography

Poetry

References

21st-century Irish poets
1981 births
Irish women poets
Writers from Dublin (city)
Living people
21st-century Irish women writers
Notre Dame College of Arts and Letters alumni
Alumni of University College Dublin
Irish expatriates in the United States
Irish expatriates in Wales
Date of birth missing (living people)
Academics of Cardiff University